Hubert Straßl (24 May 1918 – 8 July 1943) was an Austrian-born German fighter pilot in the Luftwaffe and fought during World War II. He was credited with 67 aerial victories—that is, 67 aerial combat encounters resulting in the destruction of the enemy aircraft—claimed in 221 combat missions. On 8 July 1943, during the Battle of Kursk, Straßl was killed in aerial combat with Soviet fighters near Ponyri.

Career
Straßl was born on 24 May 1918 at Linz, Austria. Following completion of flight and fighter pilot training, he was posted to Jagdgeschwader 51 (JG 51—51st Fighter Wing) in late 1941.

On 5 July 1943, he became a triple-ace in a day when he shot down 15 enemy aircraft in four missions south of Orel in Russia during the Battle of Kursk. Over the course of the three days, Straßl shot down 30 enemy aircraft. He was forced to bail out of his Focke Wulf Fw 190 A-4 (Werknummer 2351—factory number) following combat with a Lavochkin-Gorbunov-Gudkov LaGG-3 south of Ponyri on 8 July. His parachute failed to fully deploy and he fell to his death. On 12 November 1943, Straßl was awarded a posthumous Knight's Cross of the Iron Cross (Ritterkreuz des Eisernen Kreuzes).

Summary of career

Aerial victory claims
According to US historian David T. Zabecki, Straßl was credited with 67 aerial victories. Spick also lists Straßl with 67 enemy aircraft shot down, claimed in 221 combat missions, all of which on the Eastern Front. Mathews and Foreman, authors of Luftwaffe Aces – Biographies and Victory Claims, researched the German Federal Archives and found records for 67 aerial victory claims, all of which claimed on the Eastern Front.

Victory claims were logged to a map-reference (PQ = Planquadrat), for example "PQ 47722". These sectors were then subdivided into 36 smaller units to give a location area 3 × 4 km in size.

Awards
 Iron Cross (1939) 2nd and 1st Class
 Front Flying Clasp of the Luftwaffe in Gold
 Honour Goblet of the Luftwaffe (22 July 1943)
 German Cross in Gold on 16 August 1943 as Feldwebel in the 8./Jagdgeschwader 51
 Knight's Cross of the Iron Cross on 12 November 1943 (posthumously) as Oberfeldwebel and pilot in the 8./Jagdgeschwader 51 "Mölders"

Notes

References

Citations

Bibliography

External links

1918 births
1943 deaths
Military personnel from Linz
German World War II flying aces
Luftwaffe pilots
Recipients of the Gold German Cross
Recipients of the Knight's Cross of the Iron Cross
Luftwaffe personnel killed in World War II
Aviators killed by being shot down